The 2003 WNBA season was the 7th and final season for the Cleveland Rockers franchise. The season saw the team reach the playoffs for the first time in two years. To date, they are the only to qualify for the WNBA Playoffs in their final season of play. The team disbanded after the season after no new ownership was found.

Offseason

Dispersal Draft

WNBA Draft

Regular season

Season standings

Season schedule

Player stats

References

Cleveland Rockers seasons
Cleveland
Cleveland Rockers